El Efecto is a Brazilian rock band, formed in 2002 by Tomás Rosati, Bruno Danton and Eduardo Baker. All their studio works are available for free download at their official website. Their lyrics often deal with political and social subjects.

In 2013, their third album Pedras e Sonhos (Rocks and Dreams) made the group be nominated for the Prêmio da Música Brasileira Award, in the category Best Pop/Rock/Reggae/Hip hop/Funk Group.

In December 2014, they released their fourth album, A Cantiga É uma Arma, (Cantiga 
Is a Weapon) which features four acoustic re-recordings and two new songs, also acoustic. That album is a studio version of a show format they decided to use in order to make it possible for them to perform in places with poor infrastructure for electric music. Both the new songs were composed in 2013, when the band toured Portugal and Spain. One of the re-recordings, "Ciranda", received a video with a guest appearance of singer Daíra Saboia.

Members 
 Aline Gonçalves - flute, clarinet
 Bruno Danton - vocals, guitar, trumpet
 Cristine Ariel - guitar, cavaquinho, vocals
 Eduardo Baker / Pedro Lima - bass
 Gustavo Loureiro - drums
 Tomás Rosati - vocals, cavaquinho, percussion, clarinet
 Tomás Tróia - guitar, vocals

Discography

Albums
 Como Qualquer Outra Coisa (2004)
 Cidade das Almas Adormecidas (2008)
 Pedras e Sonhos (2012)
 A Cantiga É uma Arma (2014)
 Memórias do Fogo (2018)

EPs
 Novas Músicas Velhas Angústias (2010)

Live

Ao Vivo no Méier (2018)

References

External links
 

Musical groups established in 2002
Brazilian rock music groups
Rap rock groups
2002 establishments in Brazil
Brazilian alternative rock groups
Musical groups from Rio de Janeiro (city)